Zankhvav (also spelled Zankvav or Zankhavav) is a small town-cum-railway station in Surat District, Gujarat, India. It falls under Surat Metropolitan Region.

Zankvav is also the terminus station of the Kosamba - Zankhvav railway line. This railway line was built by Gaekwar's Baroda State Railway in 1900 as a narrow-gauge line. However, the train now runs on broad gauge. The station code is ZKV.

The State Highway 166 Kosamba-Velachha-Mangrol-Vankal-Zankhvav Road connects Zankvav to other cities.

The Postal Index Code of Zankhvav is 394440.

Zankhvav has a high school, Shantiniketan High School, which started in 1963. The town has a Community Health Center and an Industrial Training Institute.

References

See also 
List of tourist attractions in Surat

Suburban area of Surat
Cities and towns in Surat district